Tritoma biguttata is a species of pleasing fungus beetle in the family Erotylidae. It is found in North America.

Subspecies
These two subspecies belong to the species Tritoma biguttata:
 Tritoma biguttata affinis Lacordaire, 1842
 Tritoma biguttata biguttata (Say, 1825)

References

Further reading

 
 
 
 

Erotylidae
Articles created by Qbugbot
Beetles described in 1825